Symphlebia herbosa is a moth in the subfamily Arctiinae first described by Schaus in 1910. It is found in Costa Rica.

References

herbosa